Tara is the name of several inhabited localities in Russia.

Urban localities
Tara, Omsk Oblast, a town in Omsk Oblast; administratively incorporated as a town of oblast significance; 

Rural localities
Tara, Republic of Bashkortostan, a selo in Tukansky Selsoviet of Beloretsky District in the Republic of Bashkortostan;